James Hadley Chase (24 December 1906 – 6 February 1985) was an English writer. While his birth name was René Lodge Brabazon Raymond, he was well known by his various pseudonyms, including James Hadley Chase, James L. Docherty, Raymond Marshall, R. Raymond, and Ambrose Grant. He was one of the best known thriller writers of all time. The canon of Chase, comprising 90 titles, earned him a reputation as the king of thriller writers in Europe. He was also one of the internationally best-selling authors, and to date 50 of his books have been made into films.

Personal background 
René Lodge Brabazon Raymond (James Hadley Chase) was born on 24 December 1906 in London, England. He was the son of Colonel Francis Raymond of the colonial Indian Army, a veterinary surgeon. His father intended his son to have a scientific career and had him educated at King's School, Rochester, Kent.

Chase left home at the age of 18. In 1932, Chase married Sylvia Ray, and they had a son. In 1956, they moved to France. In 1969, they moved to Switzerland, living a secluded life in Corseaux-sur-Vevey, on Lake Geneva. Chase died there on 6 February 1985.

Professional background

Military service 
During World War II he served in the Royal Air Force, achieving the rank of Squadron Leader. He edited the RAF journal with David Langdon and had several stories from it published after the war in the book Slipstream: A Royal Air Force Anthology.

Writing background 
After Chase left home at the age of 18, he worked in sales, primarily focusing on books and literature. He sold children's encyclopaedias, while also working in a bookshop. He also served as an executive for a book wholesaler, before turning to a writing career that produced more than 90 mystery books. His interests included photography, of a professional standard, reading, and listening to classical music and opera. As a form of relaxation between novels, he put together highly complicated and sophisticated Meccano models.

Prohibition and the ensuing Great Depression in the US (1929–39) had given rise to the Chicago gangster culture prior to World War II. This, combined with Chase's book trade experience, convinced him that there was a big demand for gangster stories. After reading James M. Cain's novel The Postman Always Rings Twice (1934), and having read about the American gangster Ma Barker and her sons, and with the help of maps and a slang dictionary, he wrote No Orchids for Miss Blandish in his spare time, he claimed over a period of six weekends, though his papers suggest it took longer. The book achieved remarkable notoriety and became one of the best-selling books of the decade. It was the subject of the 1944 essay "Raffles and Miss Blandish" by George Orwell. Chase and Robert Nesbitt adapted it to a stage play of the same name which ran in London's West End to good reviews. The 1948 film adaptation was widely denounced as salacious due to the film's portrayal of violence and sexuality. Robert Aldrich did a remake, The Grissom Gang, in 1971.

During the war, Raymond edited the RAF's official magazine and from that period comes Chase's short story "The Mirror in Room 22", in which he tried his hand outside the crime genre. It was set in an old house, occupied by officers of a squadron. The owner of the house had committed suicide in his bedroom, and the last two occupants of the room had been found with a razor in their hands and their throats cut. The Wing Commander tells that when he started to shave before the mirror, he found another face in it. The apparition drew the razor across his throat. The Wing Commander says, "I use a safety razor, otherwise, I might have met with a serious accident – especially if I had been using an old-fashioned cut-throat." The story was published under the author's real name, Rene Raymond, in the anthology of RAF writings Slipstream in 1946.

During World War II, Chase became friendly with Merrill Panitt (subsequently editor of TV Guide), who provided him with a dictionary of American slang, detailed maps and reference books of the American underworld. This gave Chase the background for his early books with American settings, a number of which were based on actual events occurring there. Chase never lived in the United States though he did make two brief visits, one to Miami and the other en route to Mexico.

Over the years, Chase developed a distinct, signature style in his writing that was fast-paced, with little explanations or details about the surroundings or weather, unreliable characters. Characters in his novels and short stories would be more coherent and consistent who acted and reacted with unbreakable logic. Punchy sentences, short bursts of dialogue in authentic sounding slang with plenty of action were the characteristics of his writing. 

Chase was subject to several court cases during his career. In 1942, his novel Miss Callaghan Comes to Grief (1941), a lurid account of the white slave trade, was banned by the British authorities after the author and publishers Jarrold were found guilty of causing the publication of an obscene book. Each was fined £100. In the court case, Chase was supported by literary figures such as H. E. Bates and John Betjeman. Later, the Anglo-American crime author Raymond Chandler successfully claimed that Chase had lifted a section of his work in Blonde's Requiem (published 1945) forcing Chase to issue an apology in The Bookseller.

By the end of World War II, eleven Chase titles had been published and he decided to adopt a different writing approach. All of his books to date had been compared to each other, and he wanted to move away from the American gangster scene to the London underworld that had sprung up following the end of German hostilities. He wrote More Deadly Than the Male under a new pseudonym, Ambrose Grant, and it was published in 1947 by Eyre and Spottiswoode, Graham Greene's publisher at that time. Alerted to Grant's new book, Greene gave it high praise as did the critics who, at the time, had no idea that Chase was the author. Contrary to rumour, the two authors did not know each other at the time, though they then became friends for the remainder of their lives, as Chase's papers and letters reveal. In the early 1960s, both men were caught up in an investment scandal involving Tom Roe which was to lead to Greene's tax exile beginning in 1966.

In one of the chapters of The Wary Transgressor (1952) Chase gave a portrayal of a fanatical British General that was lifted by Hans Hellmut Kirst in his novel The Night of the Generals (which later became a film starring Peter O'Toole in the title role). Chase (who had nothing whatsoever to do with the making of the film) threatened a lawsuit, and Kirst subsequently acknowledged Chase's original idea in his book, as did Columbia Pictures, who included a credit that the plot of the film stemmed from an original Chase idea.

The first cut of Joseph Losey's 1962 film version of Chase's thriller Eve (1945), Eva was considered too long, at 155 minutes, and the producers, the Hakim Brothers, insisted it not only be withdrawn from the Venice Film Festival, but be severely cut. When the film finally opened in Paris at 116 minutes, it was described as the most traumatic disaster of Losey's career. The original book was a psychological study of a prostitute (Chase, with his wife's blessing, picked out a "lady of the night" and offered her £5 and a good lunch if she would let him pick her brains). Set in America, the film version was moved to Venice and starred Stanley Baker as a Welsh writer obsessed with a cold-hearted femme fatale, Eve (Jeanne Moreau).

All of his novels were so fast-paced that the reader was compelled to turn the pages in a non-stop effort to reach the end of the book. The final page often produced a totally unexpected plot twist that would invariably leave even his most die-hard fans surprised. His early books contained some violence that matched the era in which they were written, though this was considerably toned down as plots centred more on circumstantial situations to create the high degree of tension that was the hallmark of his writing. Sex was never explicit and, though often hinted at, seldom happened.

In several of Chase's stories, the protagonist tries to get rich by committing a crime – an insurance fraud or a theft. But the scheme invariably fails and leads to a murder and finally to a cul-de-sac, in which the hero realises that he never had a chance to keep out of trouble. Women are often beautiful, clever, and treacherous; they kill unhesitatingly if they have to cover a crime. His plots typically centre around dysfunctional families, and the final denouement echoes the title.

In many of his novels, treacherous women play a significant role. The protagonist falls in love with one and is prepared to kill someone at her behest. Only when he has killed, does he realise that the woman was manipulating him for her own ends.

Chase's best market was France (more than 30 books were made into movies) where all of his ninety titles were published by Éditions Gallimard in their Série noire series. He was also very popular in other European markets, as well as Africa and Asia. Following perestroika, Centrepolygraph in Russia contracted to publish all his titles. However, his books failed to take hold in the American market.

Published works

James Hadley Chase

Raymond Marshall

Others
He Wont Need It Now (as James L. Docherty, 1941)
Slipstream: A Royal Air Force Anthology (as R. Raymond, 1946)
More Deadly Than the Male (as Ambrose Grant, 1947)

See also 
 Le Monde's 100 Books of the Century

References

External links 

 PC Sarkar's dedicated website (2004) on [www.angelfire.com/celeb2/hadleychase/index.htm]
 

1906 births
1985 deaths
British thriller writers
Writers from London
Royal Air Force squadron leaders
20th-century English novelists
English male novelists
20th-century English male writers
Royal Air Force personnel of World War II
20th-century pseudonymous writers
Military personnel from London